Željko Kaluđerović (Cyrillic: Жељко Калуђеровић, born 1 March 1964) is a Montenegrin retired footballer who played as a goalkeeper.

Club career
As a son of former goalkeeper Božidar Kaluđerović, he started his career at Mornar and joined Red Star Belgrade in 1987. Kaluđerović featured as a substitute in the away match in the second round of the 1990–91 European Cup at Rangers. Red Star won the tournament as only Yugoslav team. In 1992, he was on an eight-month loan in Sweden. Back home his career didn't prosper with the start of the Yugoslav Wars and he rejoinend Mornar.

Kaluđerović is participating in a UEFA A-license coaching course in 2011 He is the goalkeeping coach at Mornar.

References

1964 births
Living people
People from Bar, Montenegro
Association football goalkeepers
Yugoslav footballers
Serbia and Montenegro footballers
FK Mornar players
Red Star Belgrade footballers
Djurgårdens IF Fotboll players
Yugoslav First League players
Allsvenskan players
Serbia and Montenegro expatriate footballers
Expatriate footballers in Sweden
Serbia and Montenegro expatriate sportspeople in Sweden
Association football goalkeeping coaches